Horsky or Horský (Czech/Slovak feminine: Horská) is a surname. It is derived from the Czech, Slovak, and Ukrainian noun hora ("mountain"). Notable persons with the surname include:
 Alla Horska (1929—1970), Ukrainian painter
 Charles Antone Horsky (1910–1997), American lawyer
 Ladislav Horský (1927–1983), Slovak ice hockey player
 Michal Horský (1943–2018), Slovak politician
 Miluše Horská (born 1959), Czech pedagogue and politician
 Ondřej Horský (born 1977), Czech sprint canoer

See also
 
 

Czech-language surnames
Slovak-language surnames